Astralium milloni is a species of sea snail, a marine gastropod mollusk in the family Turbinidae, the turban snails.

Distribution
This species occurs in the Pacific Ocean. The holotype was found off French Polynesia.

References

Astraea (Celcar) milloni sp. n. (Archaeogastropoda, Turbinidae) de Rapa (Australes) Polynésie française. Cahiers du Pacifique 17: 245-252

External links
 To GenBank (11 nucleotides; 8 proteins)
 To World Register of Marine Species

milloni
Gastropods described in 1973